Kuda Tissa was a king of Anuradhapura, the first established kingdom in ancient Sri Lanka. He ruled in the 1st century BC, between 50 BC to 47 BC.  He succeeded his uncle Chora Naga as King of Anuradhapura and was succeeded by Siva I.

See also 
 List of Sri Lankan monarchs
 History of Sri Lanka

References

External links 
 Kings & Rulers of Sri Lanka
 Codrington's Short History of Ceylon

Monarchs of Anuradhapura
Sinhalese kings
K
K